Tamez may refer to:

Altair Tejeda de Tamez (born 1922), Mexican short story writer, poet, playwright and journalist
Eloisa Garcia Tamez (born 1935), Lipan Apache (Nde') civil and human rights leader, lecturer, professional nurse, professor
Enrique Garza Támez, General Secretary of the state Congress in Tamaulipas, Mexico
Jared Tamez, of Salt Lake City, Utah, historian and contributor to Mormonism: A Historical Encyclopedia
Jose Tamez, president of Salma Hayek's Ventanarosa Productions
Mayela Quiroga Tamez (born 1976), Mexican politician
Margo Tamez, Lipan Apache and Jumano Apache activist, poet, and scholar
Rebeca Tamez (born 1975), former Miss Mexico Universe
Reyes Tamez (born 1952), Mexican immunochemist